Alex Martinez may refer to:

 Alex Martínez (footballer, born 1959), Chilean footballer
 Álex Martínez (footballer, born 1990), Spanish footballer
 Alex Martínez (footballer, born 1991), Uruguayan footballer
 Àlex Martínez (footballer, born 1998), Andorran footballer
 Alex Martinez (graffiti artist), American graffiti artist
 Álex Martínez (actor) (born 1991), Spanish actor
 Alex Martínez (weightlifter) (born 1939), Salvadoran weightlifter
 Alex J. Martinez (born 1951), Colorado Supreme Court Justice

See also
 Alexandre Martínez, Andorran footballer 
 Alejandro Martínez (disambiguation)
 Alec Martinez (born 1987), American ice hockey player